is a Japanese footballer who plays for FC Osaka.

Club statistics
Updated to 23 February 2019.

References

External links

Profile at Kyoto Sanga
Profile at Fujieda MYFC

1994 births
Living people
Association football people from Osaka Prefecture
Japanese footballers
J2 League players
J3 League players
Japan Football League players
Kyoto Sanga FC players
SP Kyoto FC players
FC Osaka players
Fujieda MYFC players
Association football defenders
People from Tondabayashi, Osaka